Paul Bäumer was a German First World War fighter ace credited with 43 aerial victories. He won his first three aerial victories while flying for Jagdstaffel 5. He then transferred to Jagdstaffel 2, where he scored the remaining 40 victories of his combat career. Three of Bäumer's victims were opposing aces: Ronald Sykes, his fifth victory, and Lynn Campbell and William Hodgkinson, his 43rd.

List of victories

This list is complete for entries, though obviously not for all details. Change of jagdstaffeln is indicated by doubled lines in chart. Information was abstracted from Above the Lines: The Aces and Fighter Units of the German Air Service, Naval Air Service and Flanders Marine Corps, 1914–1918, p. 67, Norman Franks, Frank W. Bailey, Russell Guest. Grub Street, 1993.  and from The Aerodrome webpage on Paul Bäumer  Abbreviations from those sources were expanded by editor creating this list.

References

Aerial victories of Bäumer, Paul
Bäumer, Paul